Lawrence Orlo Ely Jr. (born December 19, 1947) is a former American football linebacker in the National Football League who played for the Cincinnati Bengals and Chicago Bears. He played college football for the Iowa Hawkeyes. He also played in the Canadian Football League for the BC Lions and in the WFL for the Florida Blazers.

References

1947 births
Living people
American football linebackers
Canadian football linebackers
Cincinnati Bengals players
Chicago Bears players
BC Lions players
Florida Blazers players
Iowa Hawkeyes football players